Link Up TV is a music promotional platform based in London, United Kingdom.  It has the second largest rap-based promotional YouTube channel in the United Kingdom after GRM Daily with over 11,111 videos uploaded, 1.7 million subscribers and 1.6 billion views. The site is owned by Rashid Kasirye and Enea Tanku, with the YouTube channel being launched in 2008 and the company being incorporated in 2012.

See also
 GRM Daily
 Mixtape Madness
 SB.TV

References

External links
 thelinkup.com
 

YouTube channels
Hip hop websites
British music websites